Shetphal is a village in the Mohol taluka of Solapur district in Maharashtra state, India.

Demographics
Covering  and comprising 517 households at the time of the 2011 census of India, Shetphal had a population of 2374. There were 1262 males and 1112 females, with 259 people being aged six or younger.

References

Villages in Karmala taluka